Zimenqiao Town is an urban town in Shuangfeng County, Hunan Province, People's Republic of China.

Administrative division
The town is divided into 65 villages and 1 community, the following areas: 
 
  Zimuqiao Community
  Diping Village
  Tongling Village
  Suwan Village
  Zhongjiang Village
  Baxian Village
  Chating Village
  Yinshan Village
  Jiebu Village
  Xindi Village
  Shizui Village
  Guangming Village
  Yonghe Village
  Jianshan Village
  Dongshan Village
  Shantian Village
  Kuangsha Village
  Paitou Village
  Jinkeng Village
  Longwangdian Village
  Fuling Village
  Baishan Village
   Village
  Renli Village
  Changsheng Village
  Yongsheng Village
  Fuxing Village
  Shuanglin Village
  Pingwan Village
  Yuanquan Village
  Dongwan Village
  Xinzhuang Village
  Huangshi Village
  Tuqiao Village
  Shuizhou Village
  Tonghua Village
  Zhoujing Village
  Da Village
  Xingxing Village
  Shilai Village
  Tiaoshi Village
  Huangma Village
  Xinhua Village
  Xiniu Village
  Houtian Village
  Qingshi Village
  Zhumutan Village
  Dachong Village
  Longjia Village
  Wanxi Village
  Qingfeng Village
  Wantou Village
  Tanshanba Village
  Dongwanli Village
  Ziqiao Village
  Xinghuo Village
  Qinglan Village
  Meilong Village
  Liangtian Village
  Yingxiong Village
  Shimen Village
  Zimu Village
  Shengtang Village
  Xinghui Village
  Sujia'ao Village
  Jinyuan Village
  Qianjin Village 

Divisions of Shuangfeng County